Kelly Bell (born 21 February 1982, in Aldershot) is an English former glamour model.

Career
As a child, Bell appeared as a model in many young teen girl magazines, as well as regular TV appearances. At the age of 16, she entered a modelling competition organised by the Daily Sport, winning out of several thousand entrants.

Bell was voted the UK's sexiest woman for 2007 by readers of the Daily & Sunday Sport.

Bell recorded a single titled Down 'n Dirty in 2003 and performed a concert in Colchester in aid of the Army Benevolent Fund.

Bell is a vegan, and supports the British animal rights group Vegetarians' International Voice for Animals (Viva).

References

External links

 
 Kelly Bell at MySpace

1982 births
Living people
People from Aldershot
English female models
Glamour models